Valeri Vladimirovich Shevyrev (born 12 December 1974) is a former Russian professional footballer.

Club career
He played 6 seasons in the Russian Football National League for FC Dynamo Stavropol and FC Arsenal Tula.

External links
 

1974 births
Living people
Russian footballers
Russian expatriate footballers
Expatriate footballers in Ukraine
Ukrainian Premier League players
FC Metalurh Zaporizhzhia players
FC Dynamo Stavropol players
FC Elista players
FC Chernomorets Novorossiysk players
FC Arsenal Tula players
Association football midfielders